Wiggs is a surname. Notable people with the surname include:

Carson Wiggs (born 1990), American football player
Emma Wiggs (born 1980), British paracanoeist and sitting volleyball player
Ernie Wiggs (1940–2014), New Zealand rugby player
Hubert Wiggs (1893–1977), American football player and coach
Jimmy Wiggs (1876–1963), American baseball player
Johnny Wiggs (1899–1977), jazz musician and band leader
Josephine Wiggs (born 1963), English musician
Pete Wiggs (born 1966), English musician and DJ
Richard Wiggs, environmental activist, founder of Anti-Concorde Project
Susan Wiggs, American romance novelist

See also
Mrs. Wiggs of the Cabbage Patch, 1901 novel by American author Alice Hegan Rice
Mrs. Wiggs of the Cabbage Patch (1919 film)
Mrs. Wiggs of the Cabbage Patch (1934 film)
Mrs. Wiggs of the Cabbage Patch (1942 film)
Twiggs (disambiguation)
Wigg (disambiguation)
Wigg (surname)
Wiggins (disambiguation)